Evelyne Crochet is a Franco-American classical pianist.

Biography 
Born in France, Evelyne Crochet received a First Prize at the Conservatoire de Paris where her main teachers were Yvonne Lefébure and Nadia Boulanger. She also studied with Edwin Fischer in Lucerne, Switzerland.

After being a Laureate at both the Geneva International Competition in 1956 and the International Tchaikovsky Competition in Moscow in 1958, she went on to participate in Rudolf Serkin's masterclass in Bern, resulting in him extending to her a singular invitation to go back together to the United States as his guest to study with him.

She performed in major concert halls in North, Central and South America, Europe, Japan, including multiple appearances at New York's Carnegie Hall. Following her partnership with Francis Poulenc in the Boston premiere of his Two-Piano Concerto with the Boston Symphony in 1961, she was a frequent soloist with the BSO and also appeared with the orchestras of Chicago, Detroit, Baltimore, Buffalo, Pittsburgh, the London Symphony, the Royal Philharmonic, the London Philharmonic, the Bavarian Rundfunk Orchester, the Norddeutscher Rundfunk Orchester, Paris Orchestre National, Bergen Orchestra, Bern Orchestra, Orquestra do Brazil, among many others.

Her appearances in festivals include the Berkshire Festival at Tanglewood, the Newport Festival in Rhode Island, the Marlboro and the Bach Festival in Vermont, and for many years at the Mt. Desert Chamber Music Festival in Maine with the Composers Quartet. In duo with the world renowned aerialist Philippe Petit, they performed together several benefit performances for large audiences (Petit on the high wire, Crochet at the piano).

Evelyne Crochet was on the faculty and as an artist in residence at the universities of Brandeis, Rutgers, Boston, New England Conservatory, Georgia State University, and was also an assistant to Rudolf Serkin at the Curtis Institute.

She performed the Complete Works of Debussy and recorded the Complete Piano Works of Gabriel Fauré (receiving high praise from The New York Times). She performed and recorded the complete J.S. Bach's Well-Tempered Clavier and the Goldberg Variations (music critic Richard Dyer of The Boston Globe defined it as "the most satisfactory" of all contemporary interpretations of the WTC).

Her recordings also include Schubert piano duets with Alfred Brendel, albums of Bach Transcriptions, Schubert pieces, and a premiere of unpublished works of Erik Satie.

Discography 
Bach, J. S., The Well-Tempered Clavier: 24 Preludes and Fugues, BWV 846-869, Book I, 24 Preludes and Fugues, BWV 870-893, Book II Recorded at the Academy of the Arts and Letters in New York City, Elite Recordings, Producers/Engineer: Joanna Nickrenz, Marc Aubort; Editing: Joanna Nickrenz  Bach, J. S. (Mercury) Organ Transcriptions: by Liszt, Busoni, Crochet, Prelude and Fugue in B minor, S. 544 (Liszt) , Prelude and Fugue in A minor, S. 543 (Liszt), 3 Chorale Preludes:; Wachet auf, ruft uns die Stimme (Crochet) , Nun komm, der Heiden Heiland (Busoni), O Mensch, bewein dein Sünde gross (Crochet) Bach, J. S., The Goldberg Variations, BWV 988 Recorded at the Di Menna Center in New York City, Elite Recordings, Producer/Engineer: Marc Aubort, Editing: Marc Aubort, Hsilling Chang 2012  
Beethoven, L.v. (USSR label) Piano Sonata No. 31 in A-flat major, Opus 110, 
Fauré, G.  (Vol 1)  (vol 2)  (Vox) Complete piano works: (6 CDs), vol I;CD1: Theme and Variations, Op.73   Barcarolle No. 1, Op. 26   Barcarolle No. 2, Op. 41  Barcarolle No. 3, Op.42   Barcarolle No. 4, Op.44   Barcarolle No. 5, Op. 66   Barcarolle No. 6, Op. 70  CD 2: Barcarolle No.7, Op. 90   Barcarolle No.8, Op.96   Barcarolle No.9, Op.101   Barcarolle No. 10, Op. 104, no. 2   Barcarolle No. 11, Op. 105   Barcarolle No. 12, Op. 106  Barcarolle No. 13, Op. 116   Valse-Caprice No.1, in A major, Op. 30   CD 3: Valses-Caprices (cont.):   No. 2, Op. 38   No. 3, Op. 59   No. 4, Op. 62  Pièces Brèves, Op. 84:   Capriccio in E♭ major   Fantaisie in A♭ major   Fugue in A minor    Adagietto in E minor   Improvisation in C# minor   Fugue in E minor   Allègresse in C major   Nocturne No.8, in D major   vol II, CD 1: Preludes, Op.103:   No. 1, in D♭ major  No. 2, in C# minor   No. 3, in G minor  No. 4, in F major    No. 5, in D minor  No. 6, in E♭ minor   No. 7, in A major   No. 8, in C minor  No. 9, in E minor  Impromptus:  No. 1, in E♭ major   No. 2, in F minor  No. 3, in A♭ major  No. 4, in D♭ major   No. 5, in F# minor   CD 2: Nocturnes:  No. 1, in E♭ minor, Op. 25  No. 2, in B major, Op. 33 No. 2  No. 3, in A♭ major, Op. 33 No. 3  No. 4, in E♭ major, Op. 36  No. 5, in B♭ major, Op. 37  No. 6, in D♭ major, Op. 63  No. 7, in C# minor, Op. 74  No. 8: see Vol 1, CD 3, track 2 CD 3: Nocturnes: (continued)    No. 9, in B minor, Op. 97  No. 10, in E minor, Op. 99  No. 11, in F# minor, Op. 104 no. 1  No. 12, in E minor, Op. 107  No, 13, in B minor, Op. 119 Romances sans Paroles Op. 17:  No. 1, in A♭ major  No. 2, in A minor  No. 3 in A minor  Marzurka Op. 32 
Mozart, W. A. (USSR label) Piano Sonata in A minor, K. 310, 
Satie, E. (Philips) Eighteen Piano Pieces (world premiere) Nouvelles Pièces Froides, Effronterie, Désespoir agréable, Songe creux, Profondeur, Prélude canin, Avant-dernières Pensées, 2 Rêveries Nocturnes, Première Pensée Rose-Croix, Petite Ouverture à danser, Les Trois Valses distinguées du Précieux dégoûté, 6 Gnossiennes, 3 Gymnopédies, 
Schubert, F. (Philips) Piano Sonata in A minor, Opus 143, Three Pieces, Opus Posthumous, Four-Hand Duets: (with Alfred Brendel) (Vox, Decca, Turnabout), Fantasia in F minor, Op. 103, Allegro in A minor, "Lebensstürme" Op. 144, Grand Duo Sonata in C major, Op. 140.

References

External links 
 Official website
 Évelyne Crocher on Discogs
 Bach Cantatas Website
 Évelyne Crochet on forte-piano-pianissimo
 Bach - WTC, Book II - Évelyne Crochet (Youtube)

American women classical pianists
American classical pianists
20th-century French women classical pianists
Musicians from Paris
Conservatoire de Paris alumni
Brandeis University faculty
1934 births
Living people